Dicaelus furvus is a species of ground beetle in the family Carabidae. It is found in North America.

Subspecies
These two subspecies belong to the species Dicaelus furvus:
 Dicaelus furvus carinatus Dejean, 1831
 Dicaelus furvus furvus Dejean, 1826

References

Further reading

 

Harpalinae
Articles created by Qbugbot
Beetles described in 1826